Crestwood High School is a ninth through twelfth grade, suburban, public high school located on Route 309 in Mountain Top, Pennsylvania, United States. According to the National Center for Education Statistics, in 2016–2017, Crestwood High School reported an enrollment of 883 pupils in grades 9th through 12th.

Students at Crestwood High School may choose from numerous academic, athletic, and co-curricular programs, but mainly focusing on humanities, mathematics and science, business, fine arts, and vocational-technical programs. This allows students not only to be prepared for 2 year or 4 year colleges, but also the workforce or military service. Added on to the High School's building, in 2000, was the seventh through eighth grade Middle School.

In December 2006, an F2 tornado tore through the back area of the high school.  There was no serious or irreparable damage done to the section.  The roof of the high school gym collapsed while the girls' basketball team was inside, but no one was hurt.

Extracurriculars
The district offers a wide variety of clubs, activities and sports teams.

Some of the sports programs make it to Regional and Districts Championships, and some make it to States.  The field hockey team has won four state titles, the most in Pennsylvania, and makes it to states almost every year, the basketball team has won five District Championships in the past six years, and the tennis, track and field and wrestling teams have also placed at Districts. In 2004, a turf stadium was added for the football, soccer, field hockey teams, and Marching band performances. The school's mascot is the Comet. Its colors are red and white with a touch of black.

Communities Served by Crestwood High School 

 Dorrance Township
 Fairview Township
 Nuangola
 White Haven
 Wright Township
 Slocum Township
 Dennison Township
 Rice Township
 Penn Lake

Notable alumni
 Martin Bibla, class of 1997, college football for the University of Miami, professional football for the Atlanta Falcons.
 Diane Madl Olympic Field Hockey Member.
 Sara Silvetti, class of 2000, 2008 Olympic Field Hockey Member and U.S. Field Hockey National Team Member
 Matt Wotherspoon, baseball player

References

External links
 Crestwood School District
 

Public high schools in Pennsylvania
Schools in Luzerne County, Pennsylvania